Jane Seymour (born Marjorie Seymour Fitz-patrick; March 24, 1893 – January 30, 1956) was a Canadian-American film and television actress known for her performance in films including playing mom in Tom, Dick and Harry (1941) and for roles in several TV series.

Filmography

References

External links 
 
 

1893 births
1956 deaths
Actresses from Hamilton, Ontario
American film actresses
American television actresses
Canadian emigrants to the United States
20th-century American actresses